Mieczysław Długoborski (10 January 1931 – 4 April 2020) was a Polish middle-distance runner. He competed in the men's 1500 metres at the 1952 Summer Olympics.

References

External links
 

1931 births
2020 deaths
Athletes (track and field) at the 1952 Summer Olympics
Polish male middle-distance runners
Olympic athletes of Poland
People from Pruszków
Sportspeople from Masovian Voivodeship
20th-century Polish people